Haroon Shukat (born ) is a Pakistani male weightlifter, competing in the 105 kg category and representing Pakistan at international competitions. He participated at the 2014 Asian Games in the 105 kg event and also at the 2014 Commonwealth Games in the 105 kg event.

Major competitions

References

1988 births
Living people
Pakistani male weightlifters
Place of birth missing (living people)
Weightlifters at the 2014 Asian Games
Weightlifters at the 2014 Commonwealth Games
Commonwealth Games competitors for Pakistan
Asian Games competitors for Pakistan